Time in Tennessee, as in all U.S. states, is regulated by the United States Department of Transportation. 

About 73 percent of the counties in the state of Tennessee lie in the Central Time Zone, mostly the western and middle grand divisions, while East Tennessee is mostly in the Eastern Time Zone except for three counties in that division.

All counties observe Daylight Saving Time.

Time zone boundary areas

Central boundary counties 
Bledsoe County (East)
Cumberland County (East) 
Fentress County (Middle) 
Marion County (East) 
Sequatchie County (Middle)  
Pickett County (Middle)

Eastern boundary counties 
Hamilton County 
Morgan County
Rhea County 
Roane County 
Scott County

IANA time zone database
The IANA time zone database identifier for Tennessee is America/New_York.

See also
Time in the United States 
List of counties in Tennessee

References
 

 

Tennessee 
Geography of Tennessee